Alexander "Sandy" Clark (born 28 October 1956) is a Scottish professional football manager and former player who is currently manager of Lowland League side East Stirlingshire.

Career
Clark played for several clubs in his playing career including his home town club Airdrieonians, Rangers, Heart of Midlothian (Hearts) and West Ham United. His longest and most successful spells were those at Tynecastle and Broomfield. In 1982, Clark won the Scottish PFA Players' Player of the Year award. In 1984, Clark went on to win the Scottish League Cup final with Rangers in a 3-2 victory over Celtic.

He has managed several clubs, including Partick Thistle, Hamilton Academical, Hearts (twice, once as caretaker), St Johnstone and Berwick Rangers.

His work with BBC Scotland previously included TV commentary, where he was the regular summariser to main commentator Rob MacLean.

In 2005, Clark was appointed as a striker coach at Aberdeen. He left the club in May 2009, along with manager Jimmy Calderwood and assistant Jimmy Nicholl. In January 2010 he joined Kilmarnock as first team coach, working under the same management team until the end of the 2009–10 season. Clark was a sports performance lecturer at Cumbernauld College after leaving Kilmarnock.

Clark was appointed Queen of the South's assistant manager to Allan Johnston on 14 May 2012. Johnston and Clark signed a one-year contract extension on 13 April 2013, but then moved onto Kilmarnock as that club's new management team in June 2013. Clark left Kilmarnock in May 2014 and was appointed assistant manager to Darren Young at Albion Rovers in June 2014. At the end of the 2014–15 season, Clark departed Albion Rovers and was once again re-united with Allan Johnston, this time as assistant manager of Scottish Championship club Dunfermline Athletic. Johnston and Clark departed the Pars during January 2019  and returned to Dumfries club Queens for a second spell on 5 May 2019, after the departure of Gary Naysmith. Johnston and Clark joined on a two-year contract and their first game in-charge came in the Scottish Championship play-off first-leg versus Montrose. On 16 April 2021, Johnston and Clark signed a contract extension to remain the Doonhamers management team until May 2023. On 13 February 2022, Johnston and Clark departed the Doonhamers by mutual consent (4 wins in 24 matches) as the Dumfries club languished in the automatic relegation place in the Scottish Championship.

On 25 November 2022, Clark was appointed manager of Lowland League side East Stirlingshire. This was to be Clark's first managerial position since he departed Berwick Rangers in 2005.

Personal life
Sandy Clark is the father of Nicky Clark, who has also played for Rangers.

References

External links

Profile at londonhearts.com

1956 births
Living people
Scottish football managers
Scottish footballers
Airdrieonians F.C. (1878) players
Rangers F.C. players
Hamilton Academical F.C. managers
St Johnstone F.C. managers
Heart of Midlothian F.C. players
Partick Thistle F.C. players
Dunfermline Athletic F.C. players
Dunfermline Athletic F.C. non-playing staff
Heart of Midlothian F.C. managers
West Ham United F.C. players
Partick Thistle F.C. managers
Berwick Rangers F.C. managers
Footballers from Airdrie, North Lanarkshire
Aberdeen F.C. non-playing staff
Scottish Premier League managers
Scottish Football League players
English Football League players
Association football forwards
Scottish Football League managers
Association football coaches